Eve Sonneman (born 1946 in Chicago) is an American photographer and artist.

She did a series of similar sequences in color and black and white and for diptychs.

Obtained a BFA in painting from the University of Illinois Urbana-Champaign in 1967.  Obtained a MFA from University of New Mexico in Photography in 1969.

Exhibitions 

 2018     "The Arts of Eve Sonneman: Diptychs and Watercolors," Brill Gallery, North Adams, Massachusetts 
 2018     “Sonnegrams,” Nohra Haime Gallery, New York
 2017     “New Place, New Space,” Nohra Haime Gallery, New York
 2016     "Art from the Collection Cartier Foundation Pour l’Art Contemporain, Paris,” Cartier Mansion, New York
 2016     “Forty: Rooms Anniversary Exhibition,” MoMA PS-1, New York

Works 
Real time, 1968-1974, 1976.

References

Further reading

External links 
Eve Sonneman site

American women photographers
Artists from Chicago
City University of New York faculty
New York University faculty
Rice University faculty
School of Visual Arts faculty
1946 births
Living people
American women academics
21st-century American women